= Bannbadinnka, Mali =

Bannbadinnka
- Location in Mali
- Coordinates: 13°16′53″N 10°18′53″W
- Country: Mali

Area
  - Total: 0.474 km^{2} (0.183 sq mi)
- Time zone: UTC+0 (GMT)

Bannbadinnka is a small human settlement in southwestern Mali that sits along the RN22 highway and contains 161 buildings within its jurisdiction.
